Médouneu Airport  is an airport serving Médouneu in Woleu-Ntem Province, Gabon.

See also
Transport in Gabon
List of airports in Gabon

References

External links
 OurAirports - Médouneu
 OpenStreetMap - Médouneu

Airports in Gabon